Edward Stephenson may refer to: 

Edward Stephenson (art director) (1917–2011), American art director and production designer 
Edward Stephenson (colonial administrator) (died 1768), administrator of the English East India Company
Edward Stephenson (footballer) (active 1894–1895), English football secretary-manager
Edward Stephenson (musician) (born 1976), classical/nuevo flamenco guitarist

See also
Edward Stevenson (disambiguation)